The Rectory, also known as Dyer's Store and Plain Dealing, is a historic home located near Keene, Albemarle County, Virginia.

It was added to the National Register of Historic Places in 1991.

References

Houses on the National Register of Historic Places in Virginia
Houses completed in 1848
Houses in Albemarle County, Virginia
National Register of Historic Places in Albemarle County, Virginia